Guajara can refer to:
 Guajará, a Brazilian municipality
 Mount Guajara, a canarian mountain
 Guajara, a guanche princess